Melvyn Slack (7 March 1944 – 6 August 2016) was an English footballer who played in the English Football League for Cambridge United, Southend United, and Sunderland.

References

External links
 

1944 births
2016 deaths
English footballers
Bishop Auckland F.C. players
Southend United F.C. players
Cambridge United F.C. players
Cambridge City F.C. players
Sunderland A.F.C. players
English Football League players
Association football midfielders